This overview contains the flags of dependent territories and other areas of special sovereignty.

Australia

Chile

China

Denmark

Finland

France

Overseas collectivities and territory

Overseas departments and regions

Netherlands

Constituent countries

Special municipalities

New Zealand

Dependent territories

Special territorial authority

Portugal

Spain

United Kingdom

British Overseas Territories

Saint Helena, Ascension and Tristan da Cunha

Crown Dependencies

United States

See also
 Armorial of dependent territories
 Armorial of sovereign states
 Flags of micronations
 Gallery of sovereign state flags
 List of country subdivision flags
 List of former sovereign states
 Lists of city flags

Lists and galleries of flags